

Events

Publications

Births
 February 3 – Simone Weil (died 1943)

Deaths
 October 19 – Cesare Lombroso (born 1835)

Philosophy
20th-century philosophy
Philosophy by year